Our Lord's Sermon on the Mount is a book by the 4th–5th-century saint Augustine of Hippo. Augustine undertook this work before working on the Pauline epistles because he considered chapters 5–7 of the Gospel of Matthew (the Sermon on the Mount) "a perfect standard of the Christian life".

References

External links
 Our Lord's Sermon on the Mount Text at Wikisource

4th-century books
Catholic spirituality
Works by Augustine of Hippo
Sermon on the Mount